Scorpion King may refer to:

Pharaohs 
 Scorpion I
 Scorpion II, also known as King Scorpion

Films 
 The Scorpion King (1992 film), a Hong Kong film
 The Scorpion King (film series), a spin-off of The Mummy franchise:
 The Scorpion King, a 2002 film
 The Scorpion King 2: Rise of a Warrior, a 2008 film
 The Scorpion King 3: Battle for Redemption, a 2012 film
 The Scorpion King 4: Quest for Power, a 2015 film
 The Scorpion King: Book of Souls, a 2018 film

Video games 
 The Scorpion King: Sword of Osiris, a 2002 video game
 The Scorpion King: Rise of the Akkadian, a 2002 video game

Other uses 
 Mathayus (The Scorpion King), a fictional character in the film series The Scorpion King
 Scorpion Kings, South African music duo of DJ Maphorisa and Kabza de Small
 Scorpion Kings (sometimes Scorpion Kings EP), 2019 album

See also 
 Emperor scorpion, a species of West African scorpion
 Scorpion goddess (disambiguation)